Crenatosiren is an extinct genus of dugongid sirenian known from the late Oligocene (Chattian) of Florida, North Carolina, and South Carolina. The type and only known species is Crenatosiren olseni.

Taxonomy
Crenatosiren was originally named "Halitherium" olseni by Rinehart (1976), who described the species from marine deposits of the late Oligocene (Arikareean NALMA) Parachucla Formation in the Suwannee River in Hamilton County, Florida. Domning (1991) eventually recognized the taxon as more derived than the Halitherium type species and assigned it to the new genus Crenatosiren, classifying it as a relative of the dugongid Rytiodus. The genus name is derived from the Latin words crenatus (meaning 'notched') and siren. More specimens of C. olseni were later found in the Ashley and Chandler Bridge formations of South Carolina.

References

Oligocene sirenians
Fossil taxa described in 1991
Prehistoric placental genera